Anglophone West  is a Canadian school district in New Brunswick.

Anglophone West is an Anglophone district operating 70 public schools (gr. K-12) in York, Carleton, Victoria, Madawaska and Queen's counties.

Current enrollment is approximately 24,000 students and 2000 teachers.  Anglophone West is headquartered in Fredericton. 
Anglophone West was created by merging districts 14, 17, and 18.

See also
List of school districts in New Brunswick
List of schools in New Brunswick

References

External links
 Pages - Anglophone West School District

School districts in New Brunswick
Education in York County, New Brunswick
Education in Carleton County, New Brunswick
Education in Victoria County, New Brunswick
Education in Madawaska County, New Brunswick